Francis Nicholas (born 12 June 1795 at Ealing, Middlesex; died 29 March 1858 at Ealing) was an English amateur cricketer who played first-class cricket from 1821 to 1830.  He was mainly associated with Hampshire and with Marylebone Cricket Club (MCC), of which he was a member.  He made 23 known appearances in first-class matches including 6 for the Gentlemen from 1823 to 1830.

References

External links

Bibliography
 Arthur Haygarth, Scores & Biographies, Volume 1 & 2 (1744–1840), Lillywhite, 1862

1795 births
1858 deaths
English cricketers
English cricketers of 1787 to 1825
English cricketers of 1826 to 1863
Gentlemen cricketers
Hampshire cricketers
Marylebone Cricket Club cricketers
Non-international England cricketers
Godalming Cricket Club cricketers
Marylebone Cricket Club Second 9 with 3 Others cricketers